uShip, Inc. is an Austin, Texas-based Internet company that operates uShip.com, an online marketplace for shipping services. Individuals and businesses post items they need shipped in a variety of categories, including auto transport, boat shipping, moving services, and the transport of heavy industrial equipment.

Transportation service providers on uShip place competing bids for the right to haul a customer's shipment. For some categories, including boats, autos and less-than-truckload (LTL) freight, customers can select an upfront quote for transport services or enter an acceptable price to be matched with a transporter. Customers can book a shipment immediately from these quotes or opt to wait for auction bids, similar to eBay's "buy it now" feature.

History 

CEO and founder Matthew Chasen developed the business plan for uShip while enrolled in the MBA program at the University of Texas McCombs School of Business with co-founders Jay Manickam and Mickey Millsap. In 2004, the uShip team competed in several business competitions, winning first prize at the University of North Texas, and runner-up at the Venture Labs Investment Competition (formerly the US MOOT Corp Competition) in 2004. Shortly thereafter, uShip.com was launched in the United States and received funding from Benchmark Capital in 2005.

From 2012 to 2015, uShip became the subject of a reality television series aired by A&E known as Shipping Wars, which follows a group of independent shippers who compete to bid on and deliver shipments through uShip.

uShip has developed a Shipping Price Estimator which provides estimates for transport services based on a weighted average of similar goods transported over similar distances on the uShip marketplace.

Partnerships 

In 2009, uShip entered a partnership with Ritchie Bros. Auctioneers, the world's largest auctioneer of heavy equipment, to provide real-time estimates and quotes for transportation of industrial equipment and vehicles being sold at auctions.

In 2011, eBay Motors began incorporating uShip's Shipping Price Estimator as a vehicle shipping option within all its U.S. auto, motorcycle and power sports listings.

Awards and recognition 

 Greater Austin Business Awards – Environment Category Winner (2011)
 Inc. 500 Fastest-Growing Private Companies (2010)
 Red Herring's North America 100 List (2010)
 Top Workplaces – Austin American Statesman (2010, 2011, 2012)

See also 

 Shiply
 AnyVan
 Reverse auction

References

External links 

Online marketplaces of the United States
Logistics companies of the United States
Companies based in Austin, Texas
Transportation companies based in Texas
American companies established in 2003
Transport companies established in 2003
Internet properties established in 2003
2003 establishments in Texas